The Church of the Holy Family (French: Église de la Sainte-Famille) is a Roman Catholic church located at 116 Church Street in the St. Clair County, Illinois city of Cahokia Heights. Built beginning in 1786, it is a remarkably unaltered example of the French colonial construction style known as "poteaux-sur-solle" (post-on-sill), and one of the few such buildings surviving in North America. It was declared a National Historic Landmark and added to the National Register of Historic Places in 1970.  The occupying congregation is the oldest continuously active Catholic Parish in the United States, having been founded in 1699 by Canadian missionaries, and the oldest church west of the Allegheny Mountains. At the invitation of Bishop Edward Braxton, the Institute of Christ the King Sovereign Priest continues to offer Mass in this historic church according to the Missal of 1962. Visitors are also welcome for guided tours in the summer. 
In celebration of the 2018 Illinois Bicentennial, Holy Family Church was selected as one of the Illinois 200 Great Places  by the American Institute of Architects Illinois component (AIA Illinois).

Description and history

The Church of the Holy Family stands in central Cahokia Heights, at the southeast corner of East 1st and Church Streets. The church campus includes three buildings: the 1799 church, a modern 20th-century sanctuary, and a parish house. It is built out of heavy walnut timbers that were hewn into rectangular shape and mortised into a wooden sill resting on stone slabs. The spaces between them are filled with what was termed pierrotage, a mixture of rubblestone and clay. Each of the walls slopes slightly inward as it rises, and is braced by diagonal timbers. The roof trusses are of walnut and oak, and give the roof a bell-cast appearance.

The only substantive alterations to the building have been relatively minor. Small wings were added in 1833, and in the 1890s the exterior was finished in wooden clapboards; the clapboards have since been removed. In 1949–1951 the structure's foundation underwent repairs, and some of its rotted members were replaced.

The congregation was established in 1699, when priests from Quebec (New France) arrived with Father Pinet to establish a mission. The mission was ended about 1768, and the fate of its building is not known. In 1783, Cahokia was integrated from Province of Quebec to the United States. Construction of this church began about 1786, not long after the arrival of Father Paul St. Pierre, and was formally consecrated on September 24, 1799. It remained in use by the congregation for worship until 1891, when a new stone church was built adjacent. The log church was then converted into a parish hall, a role it played until its restoration in 1949–51.

Each Sunday morning there is a Traditional Latin Mass starting at 9:00 A.M.

The Holy Family Church right next door has an English Mass starting at 10:00 A.M.

See also
List of the oldest churches in the United States
National Register of Historic Places listings in St. Clair County, Illinois

References

External links

Log Church at Holy Family Catholic Church Parish website
Photos of Holy Family log church
Holy Family Church

Churches in St. Clair County, Illinois
Churches in the Roman Catholic Diocese of Belleville
Churches on the National Register of Historic Places in Illinois
Churches used by the Institute of Christ the King Sovereign Priest
French
French colonial architecture
National Historic Landmarks in Illinois
National Register of Historic Places in St. Clair County, Illinois
Roman Catholic churches completed in 1799
Tourist attractions in St. Clair County, Illinois
Wooden churches in Illinois
18th-century Roman Catholic church buildings in the United States